The men's 85 kilograms weightlifting event was the fifth men's event at the weightlifting competition, limiting competitors to a maximum of 85 kilograms of body mass. The whole competition took place on August 15, but was divided in two parts due to the number of competitors. Group B weightlifters competed at 10:00, and Group A, at 19:00. This event was the seventh Weightlifting event to conclude.

Each lifter performed in both the snatch and clean and jerk lifts, with the final score being the sum of the lifter's best result in each. The athlete received three attempts in each of the two lifts; the score for the lift was the heaviest weight successfully lifted.

Tie-breaking rules determined the winner. Andrei Rybakou of Belarus it seemed set a world record. He lost out in the gold medal as Lu Yong of China tied this but weighed in slightly lighter – and per Olympic rules, the lighter lifter won.  The record rules first meant the earliest lifter's mark counted as to record entries, but Rybakou's world (and Olympic) records were later annulled due to doping.

Schedule
All times are China Standard Time (UTC+08:00)

Records

Results

 Andrei Rybakou of Belarus originally finished second, but was disqualified after he tested positive for oral turinabol and stanozolol.
 Vladimir Sedov of Kazakhstan originally finished fourth, but was disqualified after he tested positive for stanozolol.
 Intigam Zairov of Azerbaijan originally finished ninth, but was disqualified after he tested positive for doping.

New records

References

 Page 2674

Weightlifting at the 2008 Summer Olympics
Men's events at the 2008 Summer Olympics